The Men's 85 kg event at the 2010 South American Games was held over March 28 at 18:00.

Medalists

Results

References
Final

85kg M